Seven Deadly Arts with Akshay Kumar is a seven-part television mini-series that aired on the National Geographic Channel in 2004. It was hosted by Akshay Kumar. Kumar donated his talents to the show.

Description
The series showcases the seven martial arts of 
Kumar, who began learning martial arts at age 9, played the master for taekwondo, karate, and Muay Thai, and played the student of the other forms of martial arts from different trainers. The series' tagline was "The first thing you learn to kill is your ego". Kumar shared his personal beliefs about martial arts and talked about the benefits it brought to him.

Broadcast
National Geographic Channel announced the series' launch on 27 April 2004. The first part was aired on Sunday, 9 May 2004 at 8:00 p.m. The rest of the parts were aired on the following Sundays. Before the series was launched, National Geographic Channel had planned to broadcast the series' second part in October–November 2004.

Cast 

 Akshay Kumar
 Kaniska Sharma
 Josette D. Normandeau
 Mehul Vora
 Puran Chauhan
 Luisa Elvira
 Jean Frenette

Production 
Kumar and his personal trainer, Mehul Vora, wrote the script. Vora also choreographed the mini-series. The series was shot in Manali, Himachal Pradesh and Mumbai in a span of 40 days. The series marked Kumar's television debut.

During the series, Kanishka Sharma taught Shaolin Kung fu to Kumar. Sifu Kaniska Sharma is the first Indian to be trained in Shaolin Temple Secular Discipline Union in China. Yogesh Sahu directed the series. Puran Chauhan also trained Kumar. After the series, Chauhan worked as a stunt director in several Hindi films.

Sponsors
Samsung, Bajaj, and Nokia were the chief sponsors. Leo Burnett Agency was responsible for the series' advertising.

References

External links 
 

2004 American television series debuts
2004 American television series endings
National Geographic (American TV channel) original programming
2000s American television miniseries
Martial arts television series